The Raša Fault is a seismogenic fault in Slovenia. It strikes NW-SE and runs parallel 25 km to the southwest of the Idrija Fault. Similar to the Idrija Fault, the fault plane dips towards the northeast. The movements along the fault are dextral strike-slip.

In Slovenia the fault extends from Nova Gorica in the northwest to Ilirska Bistrica in the southeast. In Croatia it merges into the Ilirska Bistrica – Vinodol Fault.

The Raša River follows the fault. The straight riverbed and structures close to Vremščica delineate the fault. The best exposed outcrops of the fault are near Senožeče and are preserved as heritage of national importance. Seismicity is concentrated at Mount Snežnik.

References

Further reading
Field trip guide to Raša Fault: 

Geology of Slovenia
Seismic faults of Europe